Vladimir Todorović was a Serbian medical doctor and politician. He served in the Assembly of the Federal Republic of Yugoslavia from 1992 to 1996 as a member of the Socialist Party of Serbia (Socijalistička partija Srbije, SPS).

Private career
Todorović was an orthopedist. He worked for several years at the Sveti Luka General Hospital in Smederevo, serving at different times as its director, assistant director for strategic planning and health management, and chief coordinator of the accreditation process.

Politician
The Federal Republic of Yugoslavia (FRY) was established in April 1992, following the breakup of the Socialist Federal Republic of Yugoslavia (SFRY). The first elections for the lower house of the FRY's parliament, known as the Chamber of Citizens, were held in May of the same year; half of its members were elected via first-past-the-post voting in single-member constituencies, while the other half were elected via proportional representation. Todorović was elected for the Smederevo division. During this period, Serbian and Yugoslavian politics were dominated by the SPS and its authoritarian leader, Slobodan Milošević.

The May 1992 Yugoslavian election was widely seen as lacking legitimacy due to a boycott from most opposition parties, and a new federal election was called for December 1992. The electoral system was reformed prior to the vote, such that all mandates were determined by proportional representation. Todorović appeared in the third position on the SPS's electoral list for the vastly enlarged Smederevo division and was returned to the assembly when the list won five mandates.

Todorović appears to have stood down from parliament at the time of the 1996 Yugoslavian assembly election and was later appointed as general manager of the Sveti Luka hospital. He was forced out of this role with the fall of Milošević's government in October 2000, after an awkward confrontation with several of his colleagues. A news report from the period indicates that Todovorić was regarded by supporters of the political opposition as a decent person on an individual level, though largely ineffective as a manager. He continued working at the hospital afterward.

He later left the SPS and ran for mayor of Smederevo in a 2006 by-election as the candidate of an independent group called the "Movement for Smederevo." He was defeated in the first round of voting. In the second round, he endorsed the winning candidate, Saša Radosavljević of the Democratic Party of Serbia (Demokratska stranka Srbije, DSS).

Death
Todorović died on 19 January 2022.

Electoral record

Local (Smederevo)

Federal (FR Yugoslavia)

References

1949 births
2022 deaths
Politicians from Smederevo
Members of the Chamber of Citizens (Federal Republic of Yugoslavia)
Socialist Party of Serbia politicians